Death Song is a 1991 South Korean film directed by Kim Ho-sun. It won multiple awards in the 1991 Chunsa Film Art Awards, including Best Film, the 1991 Blue Dragon Film Awards, again including Best Film, and the 1992 Grand Bell Awards.

Synopsis
Yun Sim-deok, is a Korean woman studying singing at Tokyo University during the 1920s, where she falls in love with a married Korean man studying composition. They leave Japan together, returning to Korea by ship. However the closer they come to Korea, the closer they come to being parted; and they throw themselves overboard to be together in death.

Cast
 Chang Mi-hee: Yun Sim-deok
 Kim Sung-min: Kim Woo-jin
 Lee Geung-young: Hong Nan-pa
 Kim Hye-ri: Yun Seong-deok
 Kim Seong-su: Lee Yong-mun
 Cho Seon-mook: Cho Myeong-hee
 Kim Ji-hyeon: Park Jeong-sik
 Jo Min-ki: Hong Hae-seong
 Kang Kye-shik: Woo Jin-bu
 Kim Jin-hwa: Woo Jin-cheo

Awards

Bibliography

English

Korean

Television series
In 2018, a 3-episode drama titled The Hymn of Death based on the film was produced by SBS.

Notes

1991 films
1990s Korean-language films
South Korean drama films
Best Picture Blue Dragon Film Award winners
Films set in Korea under Japanese rule
Biographical films about singers